Dean Sewell (born 13 April 1972) is a retired Jamaican football player. He is the father of Dean Sewell II and Noah Sewell. He is also the husband of Antonette Sewell.

Playing career
Nicknamed 'Two Face', he played for several clubs in the United States, including Charleston Battery and Connecticut Wolves. He also played college soccer at New Hampshire College (now Southern New Hampshire University). In Jamaica, he played for Constant Spring, where he also started his career.

International career
Sewell played his international football for his country of origin, Jamaica, and was a participant at the 1998 FIFA World Cup. He made his debut in 1993 and played his last international in 2000 against the Cayman Islands, earning over 20 caps for the Reggae Boyz.

International goals
Scores and results list Jamaica's goal tally first.

References

1972 births
Jamaican footballers
Jamaican expatriate footballers
1993 CONCACAF Gold Cup players
1998 FIFA World Cup players
Jamaica international footballers
Living people
Charleston Battery players
Southern New Hampshire Penmen men's soccer players
Connecticut Wolves players
Expatriate soccer players in the United States
Jamaican expatriate sportspeople in the United States
Association football midfielders
Association football defenders